Enzo Lefort (born 29 September 1991) is a French right-handed foil fencer.

Lefort is a four-time team European champion, 2014 team world champion, and two-time individual world champion.

A three-time Olympian, Lefort is a 2016 team Olympic silver medalist and 2021 team Olympic champion.

Lefort competed in the 2012 London Olympic Games, the 2016 Rio de Janeiro Olympic Games, and the 2020 Tokyo Olympic Games.

Career

Lefort was born in French Guiana. He discovered fencing when he was five, while watching fellow French Caribbean Laura Flessel win the gold medal in the 1996 Summer Olympics at Atlanta. He began fencing at CREPS in Les Abymes, Guadeloupe, where he trained under Ruddy Plicoste along with Jean-Paul Tony Helissey and Ysaora Thibus. He later joined the centre for promising athletes in Châtenay-Malabry in metropolitan France.

Lefort won the French national championship in 2012. At the 2012 Summer Olympics he competed in the Men's foil, but was defeated in the second round. In the team event, France were defeated 39–45 against the United States in the quarter-finals. After the fencing section of the Lagardère Paris Racing was dissolved, Lefort joined the Cercle d'Escrime Melun Val de Seine.

In the 2013–14 season Lefort won the Challenge International de Paris, his first World Cup medal, and climbed the podium in Venice, Saint-Petersburg and Havana. In the European Championships at Strasbourg, Lefort was defeated in the second round by Denmark's Emil Ulrik Andersen. In the team event, France received a bye, then overcame the Czech Republic and Russia to meet Italy in the final. They prevailed 45–41 to earn the gold medal. A month later in the World Championships at Kazan, Lefort was seeded number two. He made his way to the quarter-finals, where he defeated reigning European champion James-Andrew Davis, but was defeated in the semi-final by Aleksey Cheremisinov of Russia and came away with a bronze medal. In the team event, No.2 seeded France received a bye, then knocked out Hong Kong, Germany and hosts Russia to meet China in the Final. They beat China 45–25 to earn the gold medal. Lefort finished the season No.2 in FIE rankings.

In 2017, he was the flag bearer for France at the World Military Championships.

At the 2019 World Championships in Budapest, he won gold in the individual men's foil.  That year, he also won bronze in the European Championships.

National Honours 
He was named a Knight of the National Order of Merit in 2016, and a Knight of the National Order of the Legion of Honour in 2021.

Medal Record

Olympic Games

World Championship

European Championship

Grand Prix

World Cup

References

External links

Profile at the European Fencing Confederation

French male foil fencers
Living people
French people of French Guianan descent
Olympic fencers of France
Fencers at the 2012 Summer Olympics
Fencers at the 2016 Summer Olympics
1991 births
Sportspeople from Cayenne
Olympic medalists in fencing
Olympic silver medalists for France
Medalists at the 2016 Summer Olympics
Universiade medalists in fencing
Mediterranean Games silver medalists for France
Mediterranean Games medalists in fencing
Competitors at the 2013 Mediterranean Games
Universiade bronze medalists for France
Medalists at the 2013 Summer Universiade
Fencers at the 2020 Summer Olympics
Medalists at the 2020 Summer Olympics
Olympic gold medalists for France
World Fencing Championships medalists
20th-century French people
21st-century French people